Joycenara Batista (born 25 June 1967) is a Brazilian basketball player. She competed in the women's tournament at the 1992 Summer Olympics.

References

1967 births
Living people
Brazilian women's basketball players
Olympic basketball players of Brazil
Basketball players at the 1992 Summer Olympics
Sportspeople from Curitiba